The Hauran (also spelled Hawran or Houran) is a region that spans parts of southern Syria and northern Jordan. It is bound in the north by the Ghouta oasis, eastwards by the al-Safa field, to the south by Jordan's desert steppe and to the west by the Golan Heights. Traditionally, the Hauran consists of three subregions: the Nuqrah and Jaydur plains, the Jabal al-Druze massif, and the Lajat volcanic field. The population of the Hauran is largely Arab, but religiously heterogeneous; most inhabitants of the plains are Sunni Muslims belonging to large agrarian clans, while Druze form the majority in the eponymous Jabal al-Druze and a significant Greek Orthodox and Greek Catholic minority inhabit the western foothills of Jabal al-Druze. The region's largest towns are Daraa, al-Ramtha and al-Suwayda.

From the mid-1st century BCE, the region was governed by the Roman Empire's Herodian and Nabatean client kings until it was formally annexed by the empire in the 2nd century CE. The Hauran prospered under Roman rule (106–395 CE) and its villages functioned as largely self-governing units, some of which developed into imperial cities. The region continued to prosper in the Byzantine era (395–634), during which different Arab tribes ruled the Hauran on Byzantium's behalf, including the Salihids (5th century) and Ghassanids (6th century) until the Muslim conquest in the mid-630s. For much of the Islamic era until Ottoman rule (1517–1917), the Hauran was divided into the districts of al-Bathaniyya and Ḥawrān, which corresponded to the Classical Batanea and Auranitis. Medieval Muslim geographers variously described these districts as prosperous, well-watered and well-populated.

Under the Romans, the grain of Batanea and the wine of Auranitis were important for imperial trade, and throughout its history, the Hauran was the major source of the Levant's grain. The region saw a decline in the 17th century until increased demand for Syrian grain and improved security led to the agricultural revival and re-population of the Hauran in the mid-19th century. The region also historically benefited as a key transit area on the traditional Hajj caravan route to Mecca and later the Hejaz railway. The Hauran remained Syria's breadbasket until being largely supplanted by northern Syria in the mid-20th century, which coincided with its separation from interdependent areas due to international borders and the Arab–Israeli conflict. Nonetheless, it persisted as an important agricultural and commercial transit area into the 2000s. During the Syrian Civil War, which was sparked in the Hauran in 2011, it became a major conflict zone between rebels and government forces in the Daraa Governorate campaign until the government reasserted control in 2018.

The wide availability of basalt in the Hauran led to the development of a distinct vernacular architecture characterized by the exclusive use of basalt as a building material and a fusion of Hellenistic, Nabatean and Roman styles. The durability of basalt is credited for the Hauran's possession of one of the highest concentrations of well-preserved Classical-era monuments in the world. Hauran towns such as Bosra, Qanawat, Shahba, Salkhad, Umm al-Jimal and numerous others contain Roman temples and theaters, Byzantine-era churches and monasteries, and forts, mosques and bathhouses built by successive Muslim dynasties.

Geography

Geographic definition

Though its geographic definition may vary, the Hauran generally consists of the following subregions: the Hauran plain, which forms the heart of the region; the mountains of Jabal Hauran (also known as 'Jabal al-Druze' or 'Jabal al-Arab') east of the plain; and the Lajat volcanic field to the north of Jabal Hauran. The region is bound to the north by the Ghouta and Marj plains around Damascus and to the south by the desert steppe of Jordan. Its western boundary is marked by the Ruqqad tributary, which separates it from the Golan Heights (al-Jawlān in Arabic). It is eastwardly bound by the al-Hamad and al-Safa desert steppes. Geographer John Lewis Burckhardt, writing in 1812, defined it as follows:
To the south of Jabal Kiswah and Jabal Khiyara begins the country of Hauran. It is bordered on the east by the rocky district of Lajat, and by the Jabal Hauran, both of which are sometimes comprised within the Hauran ... To the southeast, where Bosra and Ramtha are the farthest inhabited villages, the Hauran borders upon the desert. Its western limits are the chain of villages on the Hajj road, from Ghabaghib as far south as Ramtha ... Hauran comprises therefore part of Trachonitis and Iturea, the whole of Auranitis, and the northern districts of Batanea.

The plain of Hauran stretches between the Marj plain of Damascus southward into modern-day Jordan where it borders Jabal Ajlun to the southwest and the desert steppe to the south and southeast. To the west is the Golan plateau and to the east are the uplands of Jabal Hauran. The plain has historically been divided into the northern Jaydur and the southern Nuqrah. The former is identified with the ancient Iturea, while the latter is identified with the ancient Batanea (al-Bathaniyya in Arabic). The much larger Nuqrah extends northward to the approaches of al-Sanamayn, being bound to the east by the Lajat and Jabal Hauran. It forms the heart of the Hauran plain. Al-Nuqra is a relatively recent appellation, meaning "the cavity" in Arabic. The Jaydur extends northwest from al-Sanamayn to the minor lava field located at the foothills of Mount Hermon (Jabal al-Shaykh in Arabic).

Topography

A common feature throughout the Hauran is the basaltic topography, though altitude and soil vary between the Hauran's subregions. The Nuqrah, Jaydur and Jabal Hauran consist of arable land derived from decomposed basaltic, volcanic rock. Its land is characterized by vast, contiguous tracts of fertile, basalt-derived soil. In contrast to the Nuqrah, the Jaydur's landscape is more fractured and rocky. In terms of its landscape and cinder cones, the Jaydur is a topographic continuation of the Golan Heights. The Lajat comprises a topography of depressions, rifts and ridges with scattered arable patches, and is characterized by rocky soil and scarce vegetation.

Climate
Rainfall above the  mark is characteristic throughout the Hauran, but otherwise climate and precipitation levels vary between its subregions. The relatively frequent rainfall and the abundance of water springs have historically allowed the Nuqrah and Jabal Hauran to become major grain-growing regions. The Hauran plain receives an average  of rainfall, which allows the plains to support stable, grain-based agriculture. Jabal Hauran receives considerably greater rainfall, which supports more orchard and tree-based cultivation. Jabal Hauran is frequently covered by snow during the winter.

History
There are records of settlements in the Hauran in the Ancient Egyptian Amarna letters and the Book of Deuteronomy of the Old Testament, when the region was generally known as Bashān. Control of it was contested between the Aramean kingdom of Damascus and the Kingdom of Israel during the 9th and 8th centuries BCE. It was ultimately conquered and pillaged by the Assyrian Empire, which held onto it from 732 to 610 BCE. Bashān later saw security and prosperity under Achaemenid rule; its settlements became better developed and culturally Aramized.

Hellenistic period
During the Hellenistic period beginning in the mid-4th century BCE, the Hauran was at first a possession of the Ptolemaic dynasty, which saw the region as a buffer zone separating their kingdom from Seleucid Damascus. Its sparse population consisted of semi-nomadic and nomadic groups such as the Itureans and Nabateans and the area remained largely undeveloped. The Seleucids conquered the Hauran following their victory over the Ptolemies in the Battle of Panium near Mount Hermon in 200 BCE. During the decline of the Seleucid Empire, the Petra-based Nabatean Kingdom emerged to the Hauran's south. The Arab Nabateans expanded their presence to the southern Hauran towns of Bosra and Salkhad. By the end of the 2nd century BCE, Seleucid control of the Hauran had become largely nominal and the region became a contested area between the Nabataean Kingdom, the Jerusalem-based Hasmonean dynasty and the Iturean principality based in the northern Golan and southern Mount Lebanon.

Roman era

Herodian period

By 63 BCE the Roman Empire extended its influence to all of Syria and initially charged local princes with keeping order in Auranitis (Jabal Hauran), Batanea (Nuqrah) and Trachonitis (Lajat). However, the districts remained largely in the hands of nomadic tribes. To supplement their meager income, these nomads often raided nearby settlements as far as Damascus, and robbed pilgrims traversing the region. When Zenodorus, a prince entrusted with the Hauran districts' security, collaborated with the nomads, the Romans transferred the districts to their Judean client king, Herod the Great in 23 BCE.

After Herod quelled resistance in the Hauran during the early years of his rule, the brigandage of the nomads largely ceased. Their rebellion resumed in 12 BCE and two years later Herod renewed his efforts to bring the nomads to heel. This resulted in an alliance formed between the nomads of Trachonitis and Auranitis with the Nabateans in Transjordan, which defeated Herod's Idumean troops. Herod ultimately stabilized the area after establishing permanent colonies and a network of forts in the less vulnerable Batanea district, from which Herod's forces could keep order without fear of attack by the nomads of Auranitis and Trachonitis. Through the establishment of security, land distribution and early tax incentives, Batanea prospered under Herod and his successors and became Syria's main source of grain. Auranitis began to similarly prosper during the reign of Philip, Herod's successor in the Hauran.

Post-annexation
By the early 2nd century CE, the last vassal kings of the Hauran region, Agrippa II ( 53–100 CE) of the Herodian Tetrarchy and Rabbel II ( 70–106 CE) of the Nabatean Kingdom, had died and Rome under Emperor Trajan ( 98–117) no longer saw the need for local intermediaries. The deaths of the Herodian and Nabatean monarchs in relatively quick succession provided an opportunity for the Romans to absorb their domains. In 106, the empire formally annexed the entire Hauran, incorporating its southern part in Arabia Province and its northern part in Syria Province. The provincial boundary followed the boundary just north of the Adraa–Bosra–Salkhad line that had separated the Herodian and Nabatean kingdoms. This administrative division remained intact for much of the 2nd century. This period, under the Antonine emperors who ruled until 180 CE, saw consistent stability, development and prosperity.

During the late 2nd century, imperial order gradually weakened and political instability ensued. In 244 a native of the Hauran, Philip the Arab, became emperor and turned his hometown of Shahba (Philippopolis) into an imperial city. Though Shahba and Auranitis prospered, the general state of the empire was marked by decline. Philip was killed in 249 and Auranitis was largely abandoned in the late 3rd century. By the early 3rd century, Auranitis, Batanea and Trachonitis had been annexed to Arabia, bringing the entire Hauran under the jurisdiction of a single province. This also coincided with the completion of the north-south Via Nova Traiana road connecting the Red Sea-port of Ayla with Bosra, the provincial capital, and an east-west road connecting the cities of the Adraa–Bosra–Salkhad line. Commenting on this development, historian Henry Innes MacAdam writes:

For the first time since the Hellenistic age the Hawran in its entirety came under one administrative system. The road network and the settlements it linked were the framework upon which the economic and social infrastructure of the region was built. Secure towns and safe, well-maintained roads meant that internal and external commerce could flow freely. The wine and grain of the Hawran were marketed, we may assume, far and wide.

After Rome's annexation, the rural villages of the Hauran exercised considerable self-rule. Each village had common areas and buildings, a law council and a treasury. Between the late 1st and 5th centuries, several underwent urbanization and became cities, including Qanawat (Canatha), al-Suwayda (Dionysias), Shahba (Philippopolis), Shaqqa (Maxmimianopolis), al-Masmiyah (Phaina) and Nawa (Naveh). The inhabitants were generally wealthy landowners whose large dwellings housed their extended families. Among the inhabitants were Roman army veterans who upon returning to their villages in the Hauran invested money in land, houses, tombs, temples and public buildings and filled high-ranking local positions. Agriculture was the main economic sector, with Batanea and Auranitis mainly producing grain and wine, respectively, both of which were important to imperial trade.

Much of the settled population consisted of Arameans, Jews and a larger Arab population, consisting of Nabateans and Safaitic groups. These groups continued to use Semitic languages, mainly Aramaic and an early form of Arabic at the colloquial level, though the Hellenization process was well underway and by the 4th century Greek supplanted the Hauran's native languages at the official level. Though the particularly wealthy and army veterans engaged in Hellenistic activities, such as visiting theaters and bathhouses, much of the population held on to Arab and Aramaic traditions and worshiped their native gods.

Byzantine era
Arab groups, including from South Arabia, continued to migrate to the Hauran well into the Byzantine period. During the 4th and 5th centuries, when direct imperial rule was weakened and nomadic groups overran the Sinai and the Euphrates valley, the Byzantines turned to certain powerful Arab tribes to maintain internal order and guard the Hauran. Beginning in the 4th century, this role was played by the Lakhmids, and by the Salihids for much of the 5th century. These groups protected the population in return for payment in gold and corn.

Ghassanid period
In the early 6th century, the Salihids were replaced by the Ghassanids. A major component of the Azd tribal confederation, the Ghassanids established themselves in Arabia Province and like the Salihids, embraced Christianity. They became formal military allies of the Byzantines in 502, contributing troops in the wars with Sassanian Persia and the Persians' Lakhmid vassals. In 531, the Ghassanid chieftain al-Harith ibn Jabalah was decreed 'phylarch of all Arabs' in the empire, but by 582 his son (and the last powerful Ghassanid phylarch) al-Mundhir III was arrested and exiled. This led to a rebellion in the Hauran and a siege on Bosra led by al-Mundhir's son al-Nu'man VI, which only ended when the latter was allowed by the Byzantines to reestablish the Ghassanid phylarchy. This only lasted until al-Nu'man was exiled in 584, after which the empire dissolved the phylarchy into numerous, smaller Ghassanid and other Arab Christian units. Some of these units continued to fight alongside the Byzantines, but their overall power had diminished, leaving the area more vulnerable to invasion. In 613, the Sassanian Persians invaded Syria and defeated the Byzantines in a battle between Adraa and Bosra.

The Byzantine era in the Hauran was marked by the dual processes of rapid Arabization and the growth of Christianity. The region's Ghassanid rulers were semi-nomadic and established permanent encampments throughout the Hauran, chief of which was al-Jabiya, but also Aqraba, Jalliq, Harith al-Jawlan and others. They were entrusted by the Byzantines to secure the Hauran's agricultural production and stave off nomadic marauders. The region prospered under Ghassanid supervision and the tribe itself built or patronized secular and religious architecture in the region's villages, including churches, monasteries and large homes for their chieftains. Although a Christian presence in some cities of Auranitis was established in the 2nd and 3rd centuries, by the 5th century nearly all the villages in the Hauran had churches, most of them dedicated to saints favored by the Arabs. The Ghassanids played a significant role in promoting Monophysite Christianity in Syria which was viewed as heretic by the Chalcedonian Church embraced by most Byzantine emperors.

Early Islamic era
The advent of Islam in Arabia and its expansion northward to Syria was countered by the Byzantines and their Arab Christian allies. However, the region's defenses had been significantly weakened as a consequence of the Ghassanids' decline in status in 582–584. The first Arab Muslim forces arrived in the Hauran in April 634 and Bosra was conquered by them in May. Following the decisive Muslim victory in the Battle of Yarmouk in 636, all of the Hauran came under Muslim rule. The Umayyad dynasty took control of the expanding Islamic caliphate and relocated its capital from Medina to Damascus and were supported by the people of Hauran. After the death of the Umayyad caliph Mu'awiya II and the ensuing chaos of succession, the Umayyads' Arab tribal allies in Syria convened a summit in the Hauran town of al-Jabiya, where they chose Marwan I to be the next caliph, in opposition to the ascendant Mecca-based Abd Allah ibn al-Zubayr. Following the Abbasids’ toppling of the Umayyads in 750, the Arab tribes of Hauran rose in a rebellion that was put down by the Abbasid general Abd Allah ibn Ali.

During the early Muslim period (7th-10th centuries), the Hauran formed part of the military district of Damascus, itself a part of the larger province of Bilad al-Sham. The Hauran subdistrict roughly corresponded to the ancient Auranitis and its capital was Bosra, while the Bathaniyya subdistrict corresponded to the ancient Batanea and had Adhri'at as its capital. Settlement within the Hauran continued and in some cases "thrived" in the early Islamic period, with "no perceptible change in activity or cultural patterns under the Umayyad caliphs", according to historian Moshe Hartal. According to the 10th-century Muslim geographer Istakhri, the Hauran and Bathaniyya were "...two great districts of the Damascus Province. Their fields are rain-watered. The frontiers of these two districts extend down to... ...the Balqa district and Amman".

The Abbasid period in Hauran was marked by numerous damaging raids from the Qarmatians of eastern Arabia in the 10th century. After 939, the Hauran and Bathaniyya districts came under the direct rule of the Egyptian-based Ikhshidid dynasty, nominal governors of the Abbasids. During this period, the large Arab tribe of Banu Uqayl, formerly allies of the Qarmatians, migrated to the Syrian steppe extending from the Hauran northward to Upper Mesopotamia. After 945, the de jure Ikshidid ruler Abu al-Misk Kafur assigned the Uqaylid sheikhs (chieftains) Salih ibn Umayr and Zalim ibn Mawhub with keeping order in the Hauran districts. This ended when the Fatimids conquered southern Syria in 970 and the Uqayl were consequently chased out of the Hauran by the Fatimid-allied tribes of Banu Fazara and Banu Murra. The villages of Hawran and Bathaniyya were rehabilitated by Abu Mahmud Ibrahim, the nominal Fatimid governor of Damascus, in the early 980s, after the damage inflicted on the area by the Fazara and Murra.

Middle Islamic era

The arrival of the Crusaders in the coastal regions of Bilad al-Sham in 1099 had repercussions for the Hauran and the region was periodically targeted by Crusaders in plundering campaigns. These occurred when the Crusaders captured Muslim-held fortresses in the Hauran or passed by the region after raids against Damascus. In the early 12th century, the entire Hauran was assigned by the Burid emir of Damascus to the Turkish general Amin al-Dawla Kumushtakin as an iqta (fief), which he held until his death in 1146. Under his patronage the region, and Bosra in particular, saw a renewal of building activity after a roughly 300-year hiatus. The population of the Hauran at the time was largely Greek Orthodox.

The last recorded appearance of the Crusaders in Hauran was in 1217. The Ayyubids had conquered the region in the late 12th century, but their rule collapsed in Syria following the Mongol invasion in 1260. That year the Mongols were defeated by the Mamluks at the Battle of Ain Jalut and Syria, including the Hauran, came under Mamluk rule.

During the 12th and 13th centuries, the Hauran continued to be administratively divided into the Hauran and Bathaniyya districts of Damascus. In general, both districts were well-populated and prosperous, benefiting particularly from grain production. Though mostly Muslim, a significant portion of the inhabitants were Christians. A contemporary Syrian geographer Yaqut al-Hamawi (died 1229) described the Hauran as "a large district full of villages and very fertile".

Following its incorporation into the Mamluk Sultanate, the Hauran continued to be divided into the two districts of the Bosra-centered Hauran and the Adhri'at-centered Bathaniyya. However, within the region were the two smaller administrative units of Salkhad, a fortress town typically held by a high-ranking Mamluk emir, and Zur’, which corresponded with the Lajat. Under the Mamluks, the region's strategic importance stemmed from its position on the barid (postal route) between Gaza and Damascus and Bosra's role as a major marshaling point for the Hajj caravans going to Mecca. The arrival of nomadic clans from the Banu Rabi'a tribe in the 14th century caused instability in the region, but they eventually became settled inhabitants.

Ottoman era

Grain cultivation and Hajj caravan transit

The Hauran was incorporated into the Ottoman Empire following its conquest of Mamluk Syria in 1517. In the early Ottoman era, during the 16th and 17th centuries, there were numerous agrarian, primarily grain-growing villages in the Hauran plain and the western slopes of Jabal Hauran. Most of the inhabitants paid taxes on wheat and barley. The Hauran had long been a major grain-producing region and officially, its land belonged to the Ottoman state and its inhabitants were required to pay taxes and be conscripted into the army. However, as state authority receded, the region effectively became autonomous. An exception to this virtual autonomy came during the annual thirty- to sixty-day Hajj season, during which the state mobilized its forces to organize, protect and supply the annual Muslim pilgrim caravan to Mecca and Medina; In the 18th century, the Hajj route was moved westward from Bosra to Muzayrib, which became the caravan's marshaling point in the Hauran.

Instead of their direct involvement in the Hauran, the authorities entrusted its affairs to the Damascene aghawat, who commanded small, mobile units of mounted irregulars. In return for the political and economic influence they were allowed in the Hauran, the aghawat secured revenue from the region's population to fund the Hajj caravan, escorted the caravan and other travelers and policed the region. The principal restriction on the power of the aghawat was resistance from the Hauran's inhabitants. Thus, the aghawat sought to become more indispensable to the local population. To that end, they often mediated between the settled inhabitants of the plain and the Bedouin nomads, and between the Hauran's population as a whole and all outside powers, including the state. According to historian Linda S. Schilcher,  This hinterland political system had its own internal checks and, of course, its strains, but it appears to have existed with a fair degree of equilibrium for a very long period of time. The low pressure of population on the land and the natural economies that existed between steppe and cultivated plain and between town and countryside appear to have contributed to this relatively stable situation.

Increased Bedouin pressures and Druze influx
As state authority receded in the Hauran, Bedouin tribes from the Anaza confederation increasingly took advantage of the security vacuum. The Bedouin encamped in the Hauran in the spring and retreated into the desert as soon as the autumn rains began. The Anaza's entry into the Hauran caused the exodus of the semi-nomadic tribes of the Banu Rabi'a confederation. The largest tribes that encamped in the Hauran were the Wuld Ali (also known as Awlad Ali), who arrived in the early 18th century, and the Rwala, who arrived in the late 18th century. Both were part of the Anaza confederation. Smaller tribes included the Sardiyah, the Sirhan and the Sulut. The Sulut, which was based in the Lajat wilderness, was the only Bedouin tribe that remained relatively stationary.

The Bedouin used the Hauran for access to water, to graze their camels and sheep and to stock up on supplies for the winter. They traded their livestock and meats for grains from the plainsmen, and wares from other Syrian merchants. The Hajj caravan was a major source of income for the Bedouin, who supplied the pilgrims with protection, logistical support, meat and transportation. Bedouin depredations against the locals included the imposition of the khuwwa (tribute), ostensibly in return for protection. The Bedouin also launched occasional raids and their flocks often grazed on the plainsmen's fields.

In addition to the Bedouin, the 18th and 19th centuries also witnessed large migrations of Druze from Mount Lebanon to the Jabal Hauran, which gradually became known as the Jabal al-Druze ('mountain of the Druze'). Their arrival pushed the mountain's previous inhabitants to the Hauran plains and introduced a new element of instability to the region. A small group of Druze led by the Alam al-Din family first arrived in 1685. A much larger wave arrived in the region as a result of the intra-Druze Battle of Ain Dara in 1711. The new arrivals were concentrated in the northwestern corner of Jabal Hauran and the Lajat and established roots in abandoned villages with extensive ancient ruins. The area was chosen by the Druze because it was well-watered, defensible and relatively close to the Druze settlements in the Damascus countryside and Mount Hermon. The paramount leaders of the community between 1711 and 1860 were the Najran-based Al Hamdan family.

Persistent migrations of Druze from Mount Lebanon, Wadi al-Taym and the Galilee, caused by the increased turbulence they faced, continued throughout the 18th century: historian Kais Firro stated that "each sign of danger in their traditional lands of settlement seemed to instigate a new Druze migration to the Hauran". During the final years of the decade-long Egyptian administration of Syria, the Druze of Jabal Hauran launched their first revolt against the authorities, in response to a conscription order by Ibrahim Pasha. By then, their numbers in the region had been swollen by migration. The 1860 Mount Lebanon civil war between the Druze and Christians and the resulting French military intervention caused another large exodus of Druze to Jabal Hauran.

The Hauran plains declined economically and demographically during the 17th and 18th centuries. Factors that caused this decline included the taxation of the peasantry by both the government and the Bedouin, periodic raids by the Bedouin and the encroachments of their livestock, and occasional strife with the neighboring Druze, Ottoman irregulars and between themselves. Many southern plainsmen migrated to the northern Hauran plain, where the soil was more productive in comparison to the drier south and was less often overrun by the Bedouin and their herds. According to the historian Norman Lewis, southern Haurani plainsmen "had been moving northwards for generations". Thus, by the start of the 19th century, the northern plains contained several full or half-empty villages, while the south had been all but deserted, with the exception of the larger towns of Daraa (Adhri'at), Bosra and al-Ramtha.

Regional revival and centralization

During the 1850s, increased demand for grain in the Damascene and European markets led to a resurgence of grain cultivation in the Hauran. This in turn brought about the mass resettlement of abandoned villages and the establishment of new settlements. By the end of the decade, resettlement caused a scarcity of grazing lands for Bedouin livestock.

The civil war of 1860, which spilled over into Damascus, where thousands of Christians were massacred, spurred the Ottomans to expand their centralization efforts in Syria. Prior to 1860, the Hauran had been largely excluded from the Tanzimat centralization reforms. In January 1861, the provincial governor, Fu'ad Pasha. attempted to integrate and reorganize the region. There followed other largely unsuccessful attempts by four successive Ottoman governors. At the time, the Hauran's leadership consisted of the chiefs of the largely pacified clans of the plains, such as Al Miqdad and Al Hariri; the more rebellious chiefs of the Druze clans of Jabal Hauran, such as Al Hamdan and Bani al-Atrash; and the chiefs of the Bedouin tribes of Rwala, Wuld Ali, Sirhan and Sardiyah, whose herds seasonally grazed the Hauran plains.

The centralization efforts, backed by the Damascene aghawat, faced stiff resistance. They were opposed by both the Druze of Ismail al-Atrash and a coalition he formed, that included the Bedouin and many of the Haurani plainsmen. This coalition was defeated in 1862 and the government came to terms with al-Atrash, entrusting him to collect taxes from the entire Hauran and to pay heavy fines in place of conscription. Though this did not translate into the ultimate goal of integrating the Hauran, and the Bedouin continued their rebellions in 1863–1864, it still ended the region's virtual autonomy.

Not until the appointment of Rashid Pasha did centralization efforts take hold. Rashid sought to change the general view in the Hauran that the government was an alien power that was only intent on collecting taxes and conscripting its youth. He accomplished this change by according the chiefs of Wuld Ali and Rwala adequate grazing lands; granting the leaders of the plainsmen and the Druze certain privileges and state functions; and replacing the aghawat as the state's intermediaries with the locals, whilst still utilizing them for military campaigns in Transjordan and facilitating the Hajj caravan. Tax concessions were also granted, but an Ottoman military presence was retained, as Rashid Pasha viewed it as a stabilising force. As part of the Hauran's reorganization, a new administrative district, the Hauran Sanjak, was formed, which included Jabal Hauran, the Nuqrah and Jaydur plains, the Golan plateau, the hilly Balqa plain and Jabal Ajlun.

Rashid Pasha also pressed wealthier Syrians to take advantage of the 1858 Land Code and auctioned massive tracts of state land. From 1869, many Damascene merchants and landowners and entrepreneurial Haurani farmers invested in these lands, which increased agricultural production. With these investments came a reinforced military presence and a consequent reduction in Bedouin raids. These combined factors caused the peasantry to “feel themselves more protected and risk further settlement", according to German archaeologist Gottlieb Schumacher.

Into the 1870s and 1880s, the peasants of the Hauran, including the Druze, persisted in their agitation against the central government, European commercial interests and their own leaders. However, increased security in the plains as well as an end to Bedouin tribute collection were both largely secured and continued into the 20th century. To illustrate the extent of the Hauran's cultivation in the mid-1890s, Schumacher noted that "no hectare of good land was without its owner". The central plain had become entirely cultivated or settled, Daraa and Bosra grew significantly and many of the hamlets established or reestablished in the 1850s had become large villages. In 1891-95, Zionist organisations, helped by Baron Edmond de Rothschild, acquired 100,000 dunams of land in Saham al-Jawlan and established there a Jewish village, but in 1896 the authorities evicted the non-Ottoman Jewish families. In 1904, the annual Hajj caravan and Muzayrib's role in it was replaced by the construction of the Hejaz Railway.

French Mandatory period

At the end of World War I, the Hauran was captured and held for about two years by the Arab army of Emir Faisal, until French forces occupied Damascus in July 1920 to enforce French Mandatory rule in Syria. A revolt broke out in the Hauran in response to the French occupation. Following the crushing of the Great Syrian Revolt, which began in the Hauran, the area experienced increased prosperity and security, as its inhabitants were now protected from incursions by Bedouin tribes.

Under French Mandatory rule, the Hauran plains formed an eponymous district within the State of Damascus, while the Jabal Hauran formed the Jabal Druze State. Its total population was 83,000 and included 110 villages. Its principal population centers were the small towns of Daraa, Bosra, Izra and Nawa. The district was subdivided into two qadaat (subdistricts), the southern one centered in Daraa and the northern one in Izra.

Post-Syrian independence period
In the period following Syria's independence from France in 1946, the Hauran developed into "a busy and prosperous region", according to the historian Dominique Sourdel. It remained a significant source of the country's grain and point of transit between Syria and Jordan. It was often a place where Bedouin came to trade their wool and butter for other commodities. However, following World War II, the Hauran also lost much of its importance within Syria's national economy. Though it continues to supply grain to Damascus, its role as the 'granary of Syria' was eclipsed by the country's northern and northeastern regions. Grain production in the Hauran has been limited by dependence on rain and underground reservoirs. Moreover, the region's economic potential has been curtailed by the creation of international borders and the Arab–Israeli conflict, which have separated it from previously interdependent areas that are located today in Israel, Lebanon and Jordan. In particular, the dual loss of Palestine as an alternative market to Damascus, and of Haifa as the Hauran's main economic outlet to the Mediterranean Sea, have also contributed to its economic decline.

Unlike other rural regions in Syria, most land in the Hauran was not concentrated in the hands of large owners, being owned instead by small or medium-sized proprietors. Thus, the region was not as affected by the Agrarian Reform Law passed in 1958 during the United Arab Republic period (1958–1961) and enforced by the Ba'ath Party government in 1963, which effected land redistribution and mostly targeted large landowners. According to historian Hanna Batatu, parts of the Hauran, such as the area within and around Bosra, were practically self-governing during the presidency of Hafez al-Assad (1970–2000). Politically, many of the clans that dominated local politics under the French continued to do so under the Ba'ath. Economically and socially, however, the higher levels of leadership within the clans declined and lower-ranking members gradually became more influential.

During the presidency of Bashar al-Assad (2000–present), the Hauran has remained an important agricultural region. Its principal city, Daraa, is a major transit hub for commercial traffic between Syria, Jordan, Saudi Arabia and Turkey, as well as for smuggled goods between these countries.

Syrian Civil War

The Syrian Civil War was sparked in the Hauran town of Daraa on 6 March 2011 when anti-government demonstrations were organized in response to the detention and alleged torture of a group of teenagers by the local branch of the security forces. As the revolt spread in the Hauran, anti-government forces utilized their clan networks that extended to Jordan and Arab states of the Persian Gulf, smuggling funds and weapons to sustain the rebellion. According to historian Nicholas Heras, "the major tribes of Dar`a are reported
to share common grievances... ...against the al-Assad government in Dar`a". During the course of the war, they formed loosely-coordinated rebel militias, fighting under the banner of the Free Syrian Army-affiliated Southern Front, which claimed it had the allegiance of some fifty armed groups with a collective strength of 30,000 fighters. Anti-government Salafist armed groups, such as the Nusra Front, also gained increasing influence, at times either challenging or cooperating with the Southern Front.

Until 2018, rebel groups controlled large areas on either side of the main north-south Damascus-Daraa highway and the Nasib border crossing, though the Syrian Army (SAA) and its affiliates controlled the highway corridor itself. Meanwhile, the pro-government Druze Muwahhidin Army largely stayed out of the fighting and secured Jabal al-Druze. In June 2018, the Syrian government launched an offensive to recapture the rebel-held areas of the Daraa and Quneitra governorates. By the end of the following month, the entire Hauran was under government control, including a pocket of territory in the Yarmouk basin that had previously been held by the Islamic State of Iraq and the Levant (ISIL). Although some rebels and their families opted to relocate to rebel-held Idlib, most rebel factions surrendered in reconciliation deals with the government and remained in their hometowns. A number of rebel groups also joined the Syrian Army offensive against ISIL.

Demography

Religion

The population of the Hauran region is religiously heterogeneous. The largely agrarian Sunni Muslim Arabs form a majority in the Hauran plain in Syria and Jordan and are known as Ḥawarna (singular: Ḥawrānī). In addition to the indigenous Ḥawarna, the plains are also populated by communities of former Bedouin tribes who gradually became settled, and Circassians who arrived over fifty years prior to the end of the 19th century.

The Druze form a majority in the Jabal Hauran, which is part of the al-Suwayda Governorate. There is a significant Christian population, both Greek Orthodox and Greek Catholic (Melkite), in the Hauran region as a whole, though most Christians are concentrated in the towns and villages straddling the western foothills of Jabal Hauran. A sizable Shia Muslim community, whose origins are from the Lebanese city of Nabatieh, make up about 40% of Bosra's population.

Clan structure and geographic distribution

The social structure of the Hauran plain is characterized by networks of large extended clans, such as the Hariri, Zu'bi, Miqdad, Abu Zeid, Mahamid, Masalma and Jawabra. The Zu'bi are the largest clan, inhabiting some sixteen villages in the Daraa and Izra districts. They also have an extensive presence across the border in the Irbid Governorate, particularly in the cities of al-Ramtha and Irbid. They form the predominant group in the city of Daraa and many of its surrounding villages. Altogether, they number some 160,000 members in southern Syria and northern Jordan.

The second largest clan are the Hariri, who generally inhabit eighteen villages, including many that are inhabited by the Zu'bi. They are mostly concentrated just north of Daraa in Abtaa, Da'el, and al-Shaykh Maskin. The Miqdad are predominant in many of the villages southwest of Daraa. They are also the largest clan in the city of Bosra, but are predated there by the smaller al-Hamd clan. The tribesmen of Nu'aym (or Na'imeh) are predominant in the towns of al-Shaykh Maskin, Jasim and Nawa in the Izra District, the villages of north-central al-Sanamayn District and in the Quneitra Governorate. Smaller clans such as the Rifa'i are concentrated in Ataman and Nasib, while the Masalma, Mahamid and Abu Zeid are concentrated in Daraa city.

Among the settled Bedouin are many Anaza tribesmen who made Daraa their home alongside the city's established agrarian clans. In addition, members of the Shammar tribal confederation from northeastern Syria have migrated to the city, mainly for economic reasons.

Like the agrarian Sunni clans of the plains, the Druze in Jabal Hauran were traditionally organized in a hierarchical clan order that saw a disparity in the distribution of social influence and prestige. The Bani al-Atrash are the leading clan and predominate in some sixteen towns and villages, mostly in the southern parts of Jabal Hauran. In the northern parts, the Bani 'Amer predominate in eleven villages, while the other major clan in the northern Jabal Hauran was the Halabiya family. Though the Bani al-Atrash and Bani ‘Amer were the more powerful clans in the governorate, members of the Banu Assaf of Attil, Salim and Walghah and Bani Abu Ras of al-Ruha historically dominated the judiciary, while the Hajari, Hinnawi and Jarbu families historically provided the Druze community's religious leadership in Qanawat.

Architecture

The Hauran has its own vernacular architectural tradition, known as the Hawrani style, which is characterized by a number of distinctive factors. One of these is the exclusive use of basaltic stone for building material. Known for its hardness and black color, basalt is readily available throughout the region and until recent decades, was used for nearly all construction work done in the Hauran. Due to a lack of timber, basalt took the usual place of wood and was used for doors, window seals and ceilings. The reliance upon basalt in the Hauran "formed a truly lithic architecture“, according to the architectural anthropologist Fleming Aalund.

The tensile strength of basalt enabled the "development of unusual building techniques", according to historian Warwick Ball. Among these methods was the cutting of long, narrow beams from basalt to roof large areas spanning  or longer. Because of the size restrictions of the beams, a distinctive system of traverse, semi-circular arches was devised to support the roof. This method "gave rise to the distinctive, cantilevered 'slab and lintel' architectural style that is peculiar to the black basalt areas of the Hauran", according to Ball.

The fusion of Nabatean, Hellenistic and Roman styles also characterizes the architecture of the region. Hawrani-style architecture is dated to at least the 1st century CE, when the Nabateans moved their capital from Petra to Bosra. The Nabateans were avid builders who had their own distinctive architectural tradition. After the Romans annexed the Kingdom of the Nabateans in 106, the area experienced a building boom that lasted until the onset of strife and instability in the mid-3rd century. Though the Romans greatly influenced the region's architecture, the Hauran's Nabatean inhabitants largely maintained their own building traditions, particularly in the smaller towns.

The architecture of the Byzantine era was influenced by the spread of Christianity and the consequent construction of churches and monasteries, the majority dating between the 4th century and early 6th century. Surveys of the region indicated that a long period of uninterrupted building activity took place in the Hauran between the Nabatean period in the 1st century to the Umayyad period in the 7th century. The region's pre-Islamic architectural tradition became the basis for later Islamic buildings in the Hauran, particularly in Bosra in the 12th–14th centuries. However, the Muslim patrons of these works also introduced outside elements, mostly inspired by Damascene architecture, to give their projects their own stately character.

Archaeology
The Hauran is distinguished by the large-scale preservation of its ancient structures. This preservation extends to public and religious buildings, but also to simpler structures, such as village dwellings. The durability of basalt is generally credited with their well-preserved state. As a result, there are some 300 towns and villages in the Hauran containing ancient structures, almost as high a concentration as the Dead Cities of northwestern Syria. In the words of 20th-century archaeologist Howard Crosby Butler,

There is no other country in the world where the architectural monuments of antiquity have been preserved in such large numbers, in such perfection, and in so many varieties as in North Central Syria [the Dead Cities] and in the Hauran. There are many places where the minor details of buildings, such as wall-paintings and mosaics, are in a better state of preservation; but there is no [other] region where numbers of towns of undoubted antiquity stand unburied, and still preserving their public and private buildings and their tombs in such a condition that, in many cases, they could be restored, with a small outlay, to their original state.

When Classical-era sites were largely resettled in the late Ottoman era, many of the Hauran's ancient monuments were converted into houses.

Surveys

The earliest surveys of the Hauran's archaeological sites were taken in the 19th century by the French archaeologist Melchior de Vogüé between 1865 and 1877, S. Merrill in 1881 and Gottlieb Schumacher in 1886 and 1888. The most thorough and abundant documentation was recorded in surveys carried out by Butler and his team from Princeton University in 1903 and 1909 and then published periodically between 1909 and 1929. In 1913, Butler also surveyed Umm al-Jimal, which contained numerous ruins, some as high as three storeys high. The period in which these surveys were carried out coincided with the Hauran's mass resettlement. This resulted in the partial damage of some sites due to their occupation as homes or as a source of masonry for new buildings, a process which continuously increased in later years.

Renewed interest in the Hauran's ancient sites began in the 1970s. Umm al-Jimal was surveyed between 1972 and 1981 by the American archaeologist Bert de Vries and reports from that expedition were published in 1998. Surveys of the Hauran plain in Syria were carried out by French expeditionary teams led by François Villeneuve in 1985 and Jean-Marie Dentzer in 1986. Early photographs of Hauran's archaeological sites, taken in the late 19th and early 20th centuries by the German explorer and photographer Hermann Burchardt, are now held at the Ethnological Museum of Berlin.

Notes

References

Bibliography

  
 
 
 
 
  
  
  
 
  
 
 
  
 
  
 
 
 
 
 
  
 
  
 
  
 
  
  

Landforms of Jordan
Landforms of Syria
Hebrew Bible places
Historical regions of Jordan
Regions of Syria
Lava plateaus